Century Building may refer to one of the following structures in the United States:

The Century (Los Angeles)
Century Building (17th Street, Manhattan)
The Century (Central Park West, Manhattan)
Century Building (Chicago)
Century Building (Pittsburgh, Pennsylvania)
Century Building (St. Louis)
Gem Theatre in Detroit, listed on the National Register of Historic Places as the Century Building and Little Theatre

See also

Century (disambiguation)
Century Building Society